Kleinmariazell is a district of Altenmarkt an der Triesting in the Wienerwald, Lower Austria, Austria.

Geography
Kleinmariazell is located north of Altenmarkt in a side valley of the Triesting in the direction of Klausen-Leopoldsdorf.
The cloister lies on an old pilgrim's trail, the Via Sacra from Vienna to Mariazell.

The community, as well as the cloister, is described and referred to as Mariazell in Austria (as opposed to Mariazell in Styria), Klein-Mariazell Monastery, or Klein-Mariazell Abbey.  Aside from a few houses on the street and an inn, it is made up exclusively of the historic cloister buildings.

History
History of Kleinmariazell:

1134 or 1136- The church and cloister were founded by Heinrich and Rapoto of Schwarzburg-Nöstach as well as the Babenberg Margrave Leopold III the Holy of Austria as Cella Sancte Marie, a Benedictine cloister. 
1782- The cloister is dissolved in the course of the Josphine Reforms and falls into decay.
1825– The cloister and its lands are put up for auction. Many owners follow, and the cloister is turned into a palace. The former monastery church becomes the local parish church.
1998– After a general renovation by the Archdiocese of Vienna with public and private support, the church is returned its original purpose.
2005– Near the church complex an apartment annex is built to hold, among others, 8 priests.

The current group of buildings follows the modern ideas of restoration and monument protection.  As a result, Kleinmariazell is no longer merely a religious center, but also an architectural artwork. The names of Christoph Cardinal Schönborn and Deacon Dr. Franz Eckert are closely connected with the building.

References
The information in this article is based on a translation from its German equivalent.

External links
 Kleinmariazell

Basilica churches in Austria
Cities and towns in Baden District, Austria
Benedictine monasteries in Austria
Pilgrimage churches in Austria